This is a list of the Romania national football team results from 1980 to 1999.

1980

1981

1982

1983

1984

1985

1986

1987

1988

1989

1990

Romania played the non-FIFA Basque Country team on 21 March 1990; this did not contribute to ranking points or individual cap totals.

1991

1992

1993

1994

1995

1996

1997

1998

1999

Notes

References
All details are sourced to the match reports cited, unless otherwise specified.

External links
Romanian Football Federation
World Referee - Matches featuring Romania
EU-Football - international football match results of Romania 1922-present

Romania national football team results
1980s in Romania
1979–80 in Romanian football
1980–81 in Romanian football
1981–82 in Romanian football
1982–83 in Romanian football
1983–84 in Romanian football
1984–85 in Romanian football
1985–86 in Romanian football
1986–87 in Romanian football
1987–88 in Romanian football
1988–89 in Romanian football
1989–90 in Romanian football
1990s in Romania
1990–91 in Romanian football
1991–92 in Romanian football
1992–93 in Romanian football
1993–94 in Romanian football
1994–95 in Romanian football
1995–96 in Romanian football
1996–97 in Romanian football
1997–98 in Romanian football
1998–99 in Romanian football
1999–2000 in Romanian football